Majungasaurinae (after Majungasaurus, itself named after the city of Mahajanga in Madagascar) is a subfamily of large carnivorous theropods from the Upper Cretaceous, found in Madagascar, India, and France. It is a subgroup within the theropod family Abelisauridae, a Gondwanan clade known for their thick and often horned skulls and vestigial arms. The two subfamilies of Abelisauridae are Carnotaurinae, best known from the South American Carnotaurus, and Majungasaurinae, consisting of Madagascar’s Majungasaurus and its closest relatives. Their ancestors emerged in the Middle Jurassic, and the clade lasted until the Upper Cretaceous.

The majungasaurines were mid-sized, bipedal predators, but relatively slow moving. Their stout legs were built for striding, not running. They had tall, deep heads with powerful jaws, but small forearms without carpals in the wrists. Because of their slow gait and small arms, they likely preyed upon the larger, slower sauropods rather than the smaller, faster ornithopods. Their ancestors lived on a unified southern continent, Gondwana, in the Early Cretaceous, but as the land mass divided they became distinct from their South American cousins, and eventually from each other.

Anatomical identification
The abelisaurids all possess distinct, vestigial, and immobile forelimbs, with highly reduced manual phalanges. Carnotaurus and Majungasaurus are closely related but distinguish by several skeletal features. Carnotaurus has eleven dorsal vertebrae but Majungasaurus has thirteen. Carnotaurus has short dentary bones and an almost vertical ramus, while that of Majungasaurus curved backward and had notable caudal projections. Majungasaurines also have low, wide antorbital fenestrae, a wide triangular plate posterior to the parietal, two holes for a cerebral vein by the sagittal crest, and a wide groove on the occipital condyle. These differences are important because derived abelisaurids are classed as either majungasaurines or carnotaurines based on their synapomorphies.

History of study 
The first majungasaurine  to be uncovered was Indosaurus, discovered in India in 1933 by Charles Alfred Matley and Friedrich von Huene, and Majungasaurus, discovered in Madagascar in 1955 by René Lavocat. Both species were misidentified at the time of their discoveries as they were known from only partial remains: Indosaurus was believed to be an allosaurid, and Majungasaurus was believed to be a pachycephalosaurid. It was not until 1991 that paleontologist Jose Bonaparte theorized that these and many other theropods belonged to the same family, the abelisaurids.

Classification

Taxonomy 
 Family Abelisauridae
 Subfamily Majungasaurinae
 Arcovenator
 Genusaurus
 Indosaurus
 Majungasaurus
 Rahiolisaurus
 Rajasaurus

Phylogeny 
The clade Majungasaurinae is relatively new, proposed in March 2014 by paleontologist Thierry Tortosa. It is defined as all abelisaurids more closely related to Majungasaurus than to Carnotaurus.

Paleobiology

Geographic range
The majungasaurines and their carnotaurine sister group emerged in what is now South America. From there they spread to the rest of Gondwana: modern Africa and India, and presumably Australia and Antarctica as well. Fragmentary evidence of abelisaurs in southern France indicates they may have spread into Europe as well, but the relationship of these species to the rest of Majungasaurinae is not well established.

Feeding habits
Like all abelisaurs, the majungasaurines were carnivorous and had bulbous teeth, short heads, and strong necks. This meant that their wide jaws were very powerful, and could crush their prey’s trachea or vertebrae once they bit down. Majungasaurus is known to have preyed upon medium-sized sauropods such as Rapetosaurus, and its teeth marks have been found on the ribs of other Majungasaurus. Whether it actively hunted members of its own species or merely cannibalized their scavenged remains is unknown. This behavior has not been observed in any other majungasaurines.

See also
 Timeline of ceratosaur research

References

Abelisaurids